Rizab (also Romanized as Rīzāb; also known as Zīrāb) is a village in Ghazali Rural District, Miyan Jolgeh District, Nishapur County, Razavi Khorasan Province, Iran. At the 2006 census, its population was 727, in 174 families.

References 

Populated places in Nishapur County